Xinjin railway station is a railway station located in Xinjin District, Chengdu, Sichuan Province, China. It is a station on the Chengdu–Mianyang–Leshan intercity railway.  The station opened on 20 December 2014 for Chengdu-Leshan train services.

Chengdu Metro
It is served by Line 10 of the Chengdu Metro.

References

Railway stations in Sichuan
Railway stations in China opened in 2014
Chengdu Metro stations